Parliamentary elections were held in Finland on 17 and 18 March 1945. The broad-based centre-left government of Prime Minister Juho Kusti Paasikivi (National Coalition/Independent) remained in office after the elections.

Background
The communists could, for the first time since 1929, freely present their candidates. Through the Finnish People's Democratic League (SKDL), they were able to win over a large section of Social Democratic voters. The Patriotic People's Movement (IKL) had been banned by the time of the election.  Prime Minister Paasikivi urged in February 1945 Finnish voters to elect "new faces" to Parliament, which they certainly did:  almost half of the 200 deputies were new.  Some wartime deputies, including Social Democrat Väinö Tanner and Agrarian Viljami Kalliokoski, decided voluntarily not to seek re-election, because under the new political climate (Finland's desire to establish friendly relations with the Soviet Union), their wartime political activities, including their association with the informal Finnish-German military alliance, looked suspicious.  The right-wing and centrist parties had to campaign carefully, so as not to appear anti-Soviet, while the Communists could loudly and vigorously accuse the right-wing and centrist parties of accepting their ban from open political activity, which had lasted from 1930 to 1944. One major economic issue in these elections was the continued scarcity of goods caused by the wartime rationing. Communists promised the impoverished voters a quick improvement in their living standards, and also other major parties promised more prosperity in the starting peacetime.  These promises were made despite the still limited Finnish foreign trade - World War II would only end in Europe in May and in Asia in September - and the heavy burden which the Soviet Union's war reparations payments imposed on the Finnish economy.

Results

References

General elections in Finland
Finland
Parliament
Finland
Election and referendum articles with incomplete results